The fifth senatorial elections of the Fifth Republic were held in France on September 26, 1971.

Context 
This election has depended largely of the results of 1971 municipal elections.

Results

Senate Presidency 
On October 2, 1971, Alain Poher was re-elected president of the Senate.

List of senators elected

References 

1971
Senate